Judita Čeřovská (21 April 1929 – 9 October 2001) was a Czech pop and chanson singer.

Career 
Born in Most, as a child Štěrbová lived in northern Bohemia. She remained there with her German grandmother even after the occupation of the Sudeten regions in 1938 and attended the German school. Her parents lived near Prague in the Protectorate of Bohemia and Moravia. Because they listened to foreign radio, they were imprisoned for several months. Before graduating from a business school, Štěrbová made a public appearance with school bands. At the age of 27, she began her semi-professional career as the wife of a lawyer and mother of two children.

In a competition for young talents she took 2nd place and shortly afterwards started singing regularly in the Prague Musikhalle Alhambra. Čeřovská has never become a full-time singer, even though she has recorded a number of successful hits. In 1959 she suffered a serious injury in a car accident from which she was able to recover. Without regular collaboration with a large dance orchestra or a renowned singer-songwriter, she was not perceived as a pop star in Czechoslovakia. She became popular abroad.

In the Federal Republic of Germany she gave concerts and also directed a TV program. She was also successful in other European countries. In 1967 she sang with some Czechoslovak fellow musicians, among them Karel Gott, at the World Exposition EXPO in Montreal. For family reasons, she refused an offer of engagement for performances in the USA. Since 1989 Judita Čeřovská switched to Jazz, Swing and Chanson.

Discography 
 Dívka jménem Pygmalion – Milan Martin/Je po dešti – Judita Čeřovská – Supraphon, single
 Dominiku – Judita Čeřovská/Pražská neděle – Karel Duba – Supraphon, single
 Dívka, jež prodává růže – Milan Chladil, Já vím – Rudolf Cortés/Buď pořád se mnou – Jiří Popper, Měsíčná řeka – Čeřovská Judita – Supraphon, single
 1965 Zas jako dřív – Judita Čeřovská/Karel Kopecký – Supraphon, single
 1966 Santa Lucia – Karel Gott/Dlouhá bílá noc – Judita Čeřovská – Supraphon, single
 1966 Pozdrav od dobré známé/To se mi nezdá – Supraphon, single
 1966 Ačkoli – Yvetta Simonová, Milan Chladil/Polibek visí na vlásku – Judita Čeřovská – Supraphon, single
 1967 Muž a žena – Judita Čeřovská/Růže kvetou dál – Helena Vondráčková – Supraphon, single
 1983 Akropolis, adieu – Supraphon 1113 3229 H, LP
 1987 Máš dvě lásky/Cesta jde dál – Supraphon, single
 1995 20× Judita Čeřovská – Akropolis Adieu, CD
 1998 Malý vůz – Sony Music Bonton
 2000 Je po dešti – Saturn
 2000 Judita Čeřovská – Music Multimedia (Areca Multimedia) – (Edice – Portréty českých hvězd)
 2003 The shadow of your smile – Stín tvého úsměvu – (písně z 1957–1969)
 2004 Lady Song – Největší hity – Supraphon (ve spolupráci s Českým rozhlasem).

Reference

Bibliography 
  Čeřovská, Judita. Je po dešti: (knihu uspořádali Eva Frančeová ... et al.). Prague: Petrklíč, 2001. 193 s.  (autobiografy, v knize vloženo CD).
 Tomeš Josef, a kol. Český biografický slovník XX. století : I. díl : A–J. Prague; Litomyšl: Paseka ; Petr Meissner, 1999. 634 p. . p. 212.

External links 

 Judita Čeřovská v cyklu České televize Příběhy slavných
 Zazpívala cokoli, ale spolupráci s StB se nevyhnula Pořad Českého rozhlasu Plus, podrobné informace o životě Judity Čeřovské, citace z materiálů Státní bezpečnosti.
 https://web.archive.org/web/20101126102238/http://www.mumost.cz/vismo/dokumenty2.asp?id_org=9959&id=3635"
 http://www.osobnosti.cz/judita-cerovska.php"
 Judita Čeřovská - Dominiku (YouTube)

1929 births
2001 deaths
Musicians from Most (city)
20th-century Czech women singers
German-language singers
English-language singers from the Czech Republic
Czech pop singers
Czechoslovak women singers